The Lizzie Borden Chronicles is an American television limited series following Lizzie Borden after she is acquitted of the murders of her father and stepmother in 1892. It premiered on Lifetime on Easter Sunday, April 5, 2015, and ended on May 25, 2015. The series is a continuation of the story begun in the network's 2014 film Lizzie Borden Took an Ax and, like the film, is fictionalized and speculative.

Plot
In 1893, four months after Lizzie Borden's acquittal for the murders of her father and stepmother, she and her sister Emma try to start a new life despite financial troubles and Lizzie's ruined reputation. Meanwhile, Pinkerton detective Charlie Siringo arrives in Fall River to investigate the case for himself.

Cast

Main
 Christina Ricci as Lizzie Borden
 Clea DuVall as Emma Borden
 Cole Hauser as Charlie Siringo

Recurring
 Olivia Llewellyn as Isabel Danforth
 John Ralston as Ezekiel Danforth
 Dylan Taylor as Officer Leslie Trotwood
 Bradley Stryker as Skipjack
 Jeff Wincott as Marshal Hilliard
 Jessy Schram as Nance O'Keefe
 Rhys Coiro as Chester Phipps
 Adrian G. Griffiths as Fredrick Lowell
 Chris Bauer as Tom Horn
 Matthew Le Nevez as Bat Masterson

Guest
 John Heard as William Almy
 Andrew Howard as William Borden
 Michael Ironside as Warren Stark
 Kimberly-Sue Murray as Adele
 Jonathan Banks as Mr. Flowers
 Frank Chiesurin as Spencer Cavanaugh
 Ronan Vibert as Dr. Vose
 Michelle Fairley as Aideen Trotwood

Episodes

Production and release
In October 2014, Lifetime announced plans for an additional limited series based on the network's 2014 film Lizzie Borden Took an Ax. Originally referred to as Lizzie Borden: The Fall River Chronicles, the series would take place after Lizzie's trial, with Ricci and DuVall reprising their roles as the Borden sisters. Hauser was cast as Pinkerton detective Charlie Siringo, who investigates other strange occurrences, including murders, centered around the Bordens. Stephen Kay directed the first two episodes.

A teaser trailer calling the series The Lizzie Borden Chronicles aired on December 8, 2014, during the second part of The Red Tent miniseries, promoting a 2015 premiere. It featured the tagline, "Lizzie Borden Has an Axe to Grind". The Hollywood Reporter wrote in October 2014 that the series would consist of six one-hour episodes, but by January 2015 the order was increased to eight. The Lizzie Borden Chronicles premiered on April 5, 2015. Most - if not all - of the series was shot in Nova Scotia, Canada, using period buildings and interiors in Halifax and other nearby communities.

Lifetime executive vice president and general manager Rob Sharenow said in 2014, “This series will take viewers further down Lizzie Borden’s dark path, revealing what many people suspected about her mysterious life." Entertainment Weekly reported that "while the film was inspired by real-life events, the series will take certain creative liberties, which draw from the mysterious events surrounding the deaths of those close to Borden in the years after her acquittal." Ricci said in January 2015, "It’s an imagining of what could've happened... There are no limits of behavior. There are no rules. It's the ultimate playing a fantasy." Director Kay added, "It's what would happen if you let this woman loose on a community." Neil Genzlinger of The New York Times noted that "the show mixes tidbits of actual history—there really was a Charlie Siringo, for instance—with lots of fiction and speculation, so don't take anything here seriously".

In June 2015, Lifetime opted to not produce further episodes.

The complete series was released on DVD by Sony Pictures Home Entertainment on February 2, 2016.

Reception
The series has garnered mixed reviews despite high praise for Ricci's performance as Borden. Jane Borden of Vanity Fair called the series "playful, wicked brain candy", adding that "Ricci was born to play a 19th-century ax murderer, as it turns out." Keith Uhlich of The Hollywood Reporter wrote, "Christina Ricci brings us the axe! Would that her effort was worth it" and Deborah Day of TheWrap noted, "Christina Ricci kills it, but even her brand of crazy is not enough." Praising Ricci's Lizzie as "gleeful and ruthless", The New York Times called the series "period-piece television served with a wink".

Awards and nominations

See also
 Blood Relations
 Fall River Legend
 The Legend of Lizzie Borden
 Lizzie Borden (opera)

References

External links
 
 
 

2010s American drama television series
2015 American television series debuts
2015 American television series endings
2010s American documentary television series
English-language television shows
Cultural depictions of Lizzie Borden
Television series set in the 1890s
Lesbian-related television shows
Television series based on actual events
Television shows set in Massachusetts
Television series by Sony Pictures Television
Lifetime (TV network) original programming
2010s horror television series